HMS Ferret was a Royal Navy  built by Benjamin Tanner at Dartmouth and launched in 1806, 19 months late. She served on the Jamaica, Halifax, and Leith (North Sea) stations during which time she took three privateers as prizes before she was wrecked in 1813.

Service
She was commissioned in March 1806 under Commander George Cadogan. On 21 June he sailed for the Leeward Islands.

Commander George Gustavus Lennock then took command of Ferret in Jamaica. She had eight guns and a crew of 58 men, and had been cruising for some time without success.

Commander Samuel John Pechell took command of Ferret on 23 March 1808 on the Jamaica station. In April he sailed her for the Halifax station. On 16 June 1808 he received a promotion to post-captain.

From June 1808 she was under Commander Richard Walter Wales. On 26 October Ferret chased a French privateer schooner for four hours before Ferret was able to take her. The schooner wase Becune, and she was armed with one long 9-pounder gun amidships and two carronades and carried a crew of 38 men. She was ten days out of Martinique and had made one capture.

In March 1809, Ferret and  captured three French schooners. They were June Rose (3 March), Rivals (12 March), and Duguay-Trouin (30 March). Duguay Trouin was a letter of marque schooner. She was commissioned in April in the Royal Navy to carry eight guns.

Between November 1811 and February 1812 Ferret underwent repairs at Portsmouth, with Commander Francis Alexander Halliday assuming command in December 1811.

Fate
On 6 January 1813 Ferret left Leith and sailed for Portsmouth. The next evening she grounded and bilged near Newbiggin-by-the-Sea (Northumberland), due to the inattention and ignorance of her pilot. The pilot, Robert Muckle, was barred from ever serving as a pilot again and was sentenced to three months in the Marshalsea prison. The court martial reprimanded the Master, Charles Lupton, for failing to keep track of her position and sentenced him to the loss of one year's seniority.

Her crew was saved and ten days later she was abandoned as a wreck. One boat crew from Ferret took advantage of the opportunity to desert. A press gang picked up three of the deserters, who received sentences of 100 lashes on their bare backs with a cat o' nine tails.

Notes, citations, and references
Notes

Citations

References

External links
 

 

1806 ships
Ships built in Dartmouth
Cruizer-class brig-sloops
Maritime incidents in 1813